The National Air and Space Museum Trophy was established in 1985. The trophy presented to the winners is a miniature version of "The Web of Space," a sculpture by artist John Safer.

The National Air and Space Museum presents this trophy annually to recognize both past and present achievements involving the management or execution of a scientific or technological project, a distinguished career of service in air and space technology, or a significant contribution in chronicling the history of air and space technology.

The trophy was created for the National Air and Space Museum by John Safer of Washington, D.C., a well-known sculptor and banker.  John Safer retired as chief executive officer of D.C. National Bank. The trophy became known as the Michael Collins Trophy in 2020.



Recipients for Lifetime Achievements
 2021 Gene Kranz
 2020 Charles Elachi
 2019 Charlie Bolden
 2018 John R. Dailey
 2017 Peter Theisinger
 2016 James A. Lovell
 2015 Stamatios Krimigis
 2014 Norm Augustine
 2013 Joe Sutter
 2012 Burt Rutan
 2011 George Mueller
 2010 Christopher C. Kraft, Jr.
 2009 John R. Casani and C. Gordon Fullerton
 2008 Col. Joseph Kittinger 
 2007 Robert A. "Bob" Hoover
 2006 James A. Van Allen
 2005 Frank N. Piasecki
 2004 Neil Armstrong  
 2003 (No Award) - In observance of the Centennial of Flight in 2003, the NASM did not award Trophy this year. 
 2002 Stanley Hiller Jr. 
 2001 Sen. John Glenn  
 2000 A. Scott Crossfield 
 1999 Dr. Simon Ramo 
 1998 Richard T. Whitcomb 
 1997 Anthony "Tony" LeVier
 1996 Gen. Bernard A. Schriever, USAF (Ret.) 
 1995 Najeeb E. Halaby  
 1994 Dr. Michael H. Carr 
 1993 Olive Ann Beech  
 1992 Francis M. Rogallo 
 1991 Arthur E. Raymond 
 1990 Kelly Johnson and the SR-71 Design Team  
 1989 Edwin Land
 1988 Harold Masursky 
 1987 John Steiner  
 1986 Sir Frank Whittle and Dr. Hans von Ohain 
 1985 Robert R. Gilruth

Recipients for Current Achievement 
 2021  SpaceX and Crew Dragon Team
 2020  Hubble Space Telescope Team
 2019  LIGO Scientific Collaboration
 2018  Shaesta Waiz of Dreams Soar Inc.
 2017  Kenn Borek Air's South Pole Rescue Team
 2016  NASA's New Horizons Mission Team
 2015  Kepler Mission Team
 2014  The Dawn Flight Team 
 2013  Mars Science Laboratory Entry, Descent and Landing team, led by Adam Steltzner
 2012  The Cassini-Huygens Flight Team
 2011  Michael Suffredini and the International Space Station Program Office
 2010  Flight crew of US Airways Flight 1549: Chesley B. Sullenberger III, Jeffrey B. Skiles, Sheila Dail, Donna Dent and Doreen Welsh
 2009  (no award)**
 2008  Stardust Comet Sample Return Mission Team
 2007  NASA STS-121 shuttle mission team
 2006 	Mars Exploration Rover Team
 2005 	Burt Rutan, Paul Allen, and the SpaceShipOne Team
 2004 	USAF/Lockheed Martin Milstar Team
 2003 	(no award)*
 2002 	Predator Development Team
 2001 	NEAR Mission Team
 2000 	The Chandra X-Ray Observatory Team
 1999 	The Breitling Orbiter 3 Team
 1998 	The Mars Pathfinder Team
 1997 	Dr. Shannon W. Lucid
 1996 	The Boeing 777 Civilian Airliner Development Team
 1995 	The X-31 International Test Team
 1994 	Patty Wagstaff
 1993 	Dr. Compton J. Tucker
 1992 	The Magellan Project Team
 1991 	John C. Mather and the Cosmic Background Explorer Team
 1990 	The Pegasus Launch Vehicle Team
 1989 	The Voyager Spacecraft Team
 1988 	Paul MacCready
 1987 	Dick Rutan and Jeana Yeager
 1986 	John W. Young
 1985 	Astronauts Kathryn D. Sullivan, Ph.D. and Capt. Bruce McCandless, USN

* In observance of the many centennial of flight celebrations in 2003, the museum did not award Trophies for that year.
** In 2009, there was no award for Current Achievement and two Lifetime Achievement Trophies were awarded.

References

External links
http://www.nasm.si.edu/research/aero/trophy/nasm.htm

American science and technology awards
Aviation history of the United States
Lifetime achievement awards
Awards established in 1985
1985 establishments in the United States